OKS "Start" Otwock is a Polish football club located in Otwock, Poland. It currently plays in III liga. The team's colors are yellow and black.

External links
 Official website
 Start Otwock at the 90minut.pl website (Polish)

Association football clubs established in 1924
1924 establishments in Poland
Otwock County
Football clubs in Masovian Voivodeship